Karadiken is a quarter of the town Abdipaşa, Ulus District, Bartın Province, Turkey. Its population is 57 (2021).

References

Ulus District